Stingfish is a common name for several fishes and may refer to:

 Several fishes in the subfamily Scorpaeninae
 Several fishes in the subfamily Synanceiinae

Fish common names